Wako, Wakō, Wakou, WAKO or W.A.K.O. can refer to: 

 Wako (retailer), a Japanese retailer whose best known store is in Ginza, Tokyo
 Wakō, Saitama, a city in Japan
 World Association of Kickboxing Organizations
 WAKO (AM), 910 AM, a radio station near Lawrenceville, Illinois
 WAKO-FM, 103.1 FM, a radio station near Lawrenceville, Illinois
 Amos Wako, the attorney general of Kenya
 Gabriel Zubeir Wako, archbishop of Khartoum, Sudan
 Haruo Wakō, a member of the Japanese Red Army
 Wokou (Japanese pronunciation wakō), pirates who raided the coastlines of China and Korea from the 13th to the 17th century

See also
 Waco (disambiguation)